"Trick of the Light" is a single released in January 1988 by Australian group The Triffids from their album Calenture (November 1987). The single appeared in 7", 10", 12" and CD single versions. It was produced by Gil Norton (Pixies, Echo & the Bunnymen, Foo Fighters) and written by David McComb. The B-Side "Love the Fever" was co-written by David McComb and Adam Peters and was produced by Peters (Family of God, The Flowerpot Men, Neulander, Sunsonic). It was recorded in August 1986.

"Trick of the Light" was the band's second United Kingdom hit reaching No. 73 on the UK singles chart in February 1988; and reached No. 77 on the Australian Kent Music Report Singles Chart.

Track listing
"Trick of the Light" - 3:50
"Love the Fever" - 4:41
"Everything You Touch Turns to Time" (12",CD) - 3:16
"Bad News Always Reminds Me of You" (10",12",CD) - 3:25

Personnel
 David McComb
 Alsy MacDonald
 Robert McComb
 Martyn P. Casey
 Jill Birt
 Graham Lee
 Adam Peters

References

External links
 Discogs release

1987 songs
1988 singles
Island Records singles
Songs written by David McComb
The Triffids songs
Song recordings produced by Gil Norton